The 43rd General Assembly of Nova Scotia represented Nova Scotia between March 14, 1946, and April 27, 1949.

Division of seats

There were 30 members of the General Assembly, elected in the 1945 Nova Scotia general election.

List of members

Former members of the 43rd General Assembly

References 
 
 Canadian Parliamentary Guide, 1948, PG Normandin

Terms of the General Assembly of Nova Scotia
1946 establishments in Nova Scotia
1949 disestablishments in Nova Scotia
20th century in Nova Scotia